Hugh Allan (1810–1882) was a Scottish-born Canadian shipping magnate.

Hugh Allan may also refer to:
Hugh Allan (politician) (1865–1949), Liberal party member of the Canadian House of Commons
H. Montagu Allan (1860–1951), Canadian banker, ship owner and sportsman
Hugh Allan (actor), actor in films such as Sin Town (1929 film)
James Allan (bishop) (Hugh James Pearson Allan, born 1928), retired Canadian Anglican bishop
Hugh Allan (abbot) (born 1976), Roman Catholic apostolic administrator of the Falkland Islands and Titular Abbot of Beeleigh

See also
Hugh Allen (disambiguation)